Jürgen Werner Gansel (born 6 July 1974) is a German politician. He is a representative of the National Democratic Party, a pan-German nationalist party in Germany. From 2004 until 2014, he was a member of the Landtag of Saxony.

References

Living people
1974 births
National Democratic Party of Germany politicians
Members of the Landtag of Saxony
German nationalists